Dehnow (also Romanized as Deh-e Now) is a village in Miankuh Rural District, Miankuh District, Ardal County, Chaharmahal and Bakhtiari Province, Iran. At the 2006 census, its population was 132, in 27 families.

References 

Populated places in Ardal County